The Tomb is a 1986 American supernatural horror film directed by Fred Olen Ray and starring John Carradine and Cameron Mitchell. The film is loosely based on the 1903 novel The Jewel of Seven Stars by Bram Stoker.

Plot synopsis
Dr. Howard Phillips robs tombs for a living, selling artifacts he steals from an unmarked tomb in Egypt. His desecration of a tomb displeases an immortal woman, who is out for revenge for the theft.

Cast
Cameron Mitchell as Dr. Howard Phillips
John Carradine as Mr. Andoheb
Sybil Danning as Jade
Michelle Bauer as Nefratis 
Kitten Natividad as Stripper
Michael Sonye as Waiter

Production
The Tomb was a low budget film.

References

 "Videohound's Golden Movie Retriever 2003", page 771. Gale Group, 2004

External links

 
 
  
 

1986 horror films
1986 films
American supernatural horror films
Films based on Irish novels
Films based on horror novels
Films directed by Fred Olen Ray
Films based on works by Bram Stoker
Mummy films
1980s English-language films
1980s American films